Hollow Bodies is the fourth studio album by American metalcore band Blessthefall. It was released on August 20, 2013, through Fearless Records and produced by Joey Sturgis. It is the third album to include lead singer Beau Bokan, second album to include rhythm guitarist, Elliott Gruenberg and the first to include the same members in consecutive albums.

The band announced the album on June 10, 2013, and published the album cover and track list. On June 25, the song "You Wear a Crown But You're No King" was released as the first single. A video of interviews with the band members in the studio was released on July 24 that also showed a preview of the second single "Déjà Vu" which was released on July 30.  On August 13, the entire album was streamed through Billboard.com.

The album debuted at No. 15 on the Billboard 200 and reached No. 1 on the Hard Rock chart selling 21,888 copies in the first week, up over 10,000 from their previous release. The album has sold 58,000 copies in the US as of August 2015.

Background and promotion 
In 2011, the band released their third album Awakening to mostly positive reviews and began numerous tours to support the album. In late 2012, they revealed they had begun writing new music and were hoping to release their fourth studio album in mid to late 2013. It was announced on Twitter that Joey Sturgis would produce the album. The band entered the studio in April 2013 and confirmed the album was complete on May 21.

The band played at the Vans Warped Tour 2013 on the main stage for the first time and played the song "You Wear a Crown But You're No King" which was later released as a single on June 25, 2013. On July 24, a studio update video was released which discussed the writing recording process. The band stated in short interviews that the album will be different than anything they've ever done; that the album takes on a much heavier mood and sound.

The second single, "Déjà Vu", was streamed through altpress.com on July 29, 2013, and was officially released the following day.

It was announced that Vic Fuentes of Pierce the Veil was working on a song with the band. It was later revealed to be the track, "See You on the Outside" which was streamed through Hot Topic on August 8, 2013.

On August 13, the entire album was streamed through Billboard's website, allowing fans to listen to the album before the official release date.

Composition 
Phil Freeman of Alternative Press wrote that "this is digitally crunchy modern metalcore" that contains "clean vocals" that "soar over beds of synth while hoarse spittle-flecked roars are bolstered by hammering, downturned guitar riffs." At HM, Anthony Bryant told that this "is another example of the group’s expert harmony of symphonicism and vicious instrumentals". Andy Biddulph stated that blessthefall has "creat[ed] a perfect marriage of electronica and metalcore." On the subject of lyricism, Freeman wrote that it "is overwrought but not embarrassingly so—the end of the relationship is compared to the collapse of an empire, but somehow it works."

Critical reception 

Hollow Bodies has received positive reception by music critics. At Alternative Press, Phil Freeman called it "an ambitious, impressive album." Anthony Biddulph of Rock Sound affirmed that this album "isn't a simple step up, this is the album that will define their career." At HM, Anthony Bryant wrote that "this album is a blistering example of why many have come to love Blessthefall and shows that, despite its hiccups, this group is still the undisputed ruler of the post-hardcore scene." Nathaniel Lay of Outburn stated that the release "carries on their tradition of putting out exciting albums that are worthy of praise and recommendation." At About.com, Chad Bowar called the album a "step forward".

Track listing

Personnel 

Blessthefall
 Beau Bokan – clean vocals, keyboards, piano, programming
 Eric Lambert – lead guitar, backing clean vocals
 Elliott Gruenberg – rhythm guitar
 Jared Warth – bass guitar, unclean vocals
 Matt Traynor – drums, percussion

Other personnel
 Vic Fuentes – co-writing on "See You on the Outside"
 Jesse Barnett – guest vocals on "Youngbloods"
 Jake Luhrs – guest vocals on "Carry On"
 Lights – guest vocals on "Open Water"

Production
 Joey Sturgis – production, mixing, mastering, programming
 Nick Scott – engineering
 Danielle Tunstall – artwork

Charts

References 

2013 albums
Blessthefall albums
Fearless Records albums
Albums produced by Joey Sturgis
Christian metal albums
Articles with hAudio microformats